The Longmoor Military Railway (LMR) was a British military railway in Hampshire, built by the Royal Engineers from 1903 in order to train soldiers on railway construction and operations. The railway ceased operation on 31 October 1969.

Route

Authorised for construction from 1902, activities date from 1903 when an  gauge tramway was laid to assist in removing 68 large corrugated iron huts from Longmoor Military Camp to Bordon.

The railway was relaid to  standard gauge in 1905–1907 and was initially known as the Woolmer Instructional Military Railway. It was renamed the Longmoor Military Railway in 1935. The Liss extension was opened in 1933. The stations and junctions included:
Bordon – the northern terminal, adjacent to Bordon station and with access to British Railways via the LSWR owned Bentley and Bordon Light Railway.
Oakhanger Halt - serving the village of Oakhanger, Hampshire. Bordon station was nearer to Oakhanger and Oakhanger station was nearer to Bordon.
Whitehill Junction - serving the village of Whitehill, Hampshire.
Two Range Halt
Woolmer - serving the hamlet of Woolmer.
Longmoor Downs – the original terminus, and largest station on the line, serving the military camp.
Weaversdown Halt – originally a passing place at the hamlet of Weaversdown, a station was constructed which served the eastern side of Longmoor Military Camp.
Liss Forest Road - serving the hamlet of Liss Forest.
Liss Junction – with access to the exchange sidings, and onwards into Liss British Railways goods yard.
Liss – the southern terminus, with a platform adjacent to those serving the Portsmouth Direct Line (still running).

An additional loop ran eastwards from Longmoor camp via a station at Hopkins Bridge to Whitehill Junction, completed in 1942. This provided circular running to the line, allowing for improved training without the need to turn trains at the terminals.

As a training railway, it was often being constructed/deconstructed. The layout would often change, and at one time housed a machine which could lay  of track a day.

Operations

The vehicles and stock on the LMR were very much an assortment to give the maximum learning opportunity. Well over a thousand locomotives had associations with the railway, although many only through the need for storage. The same was true of the signalling at the various locations on the line, including an Army version of flag signalling. After the end of World War II, the collection also included captured enemy equipment, including a "Schienenwolf" or railroad plough: a German wagon which dragged behind it a huge hook, used to destroy sleepers and so render railway lines unusable to advancing enemy troops.

In addition to the various military items, there were old versions of standard passenger carriages. A passenger service was operated over the line at various times, nominally for personnel required on the railway, and others from the War Department/Ministry of Defence and their families.

There was only one fatal accident recorded on the line, which occurred in October 1956.

With a declining military role for railways both in Britain and the rest of the world, it was inevitable that the significance of the facilities offered by the LMR would be reduced in later years. Even so, the LMR was still important enough for the tracks of the Bentley to Bordon branch to be left in place when passenger services were withdrawn on 16 September 1957. This line remained in place as, although there was a British Railways connection at Liss, the Bordon branch made it easier to accommodate the movements of military traffic at short notice. In 1966, the movement of goods over the Bordon branch was suspended, and the line was taken up in 1967.

Railway Inspectorate
Among those who learned the workings of railways on the LMR, there were a select band who continued in railway-related work after leaving the services. These were the members of the Railway Inspectorate, whose remit is to enquire into the circumstances surrounding British railway accidents. The first Chief Inspecting Officer of Railways not to have been trained in the army was R. J. Seymour, appointed in 1988.

Locomotives

The following standard gauge locomotives were in use in 1914:

The following standard gauge locomotives were present in 1947:

The following standard gauge locomotives were present in August 1963:

A notable locomotive based on the LMR was 'Kingsley', an 1886-built 4-4-0 tank locomotive.  This had formerly been locomotive No.10 of the Midland and Great Northern Joint Railway and was the last surviving locomotive from this company when scrapped in 1953.

Accidents and incidents
On 13 October 1956 a passenger train hauled by Class 8F 2-8-0 WD512 was involved in a head-on collision with a permanent way train hauled by 0-6-0 diesel shunter WD877 Bari between Weaversdown Halt and Liss Forest Road stations. Six soldiers who were in a brake van behind the diesel locomotive were killed and eight were injured. The cause of the accident was driver error on the part of the driver of the passenger train, who had entered the section without authority. This was compounded by the signalling arrangements at Liss Forest Road, where there was no trap point to prevent the train entering the section after passing a danger signal.

The signalling system at Liss Forest was single line telephone and ticket. The block man wrote out the ticket even though the work train was still in section. The ticket was exchanged for the one engine in steam key which controlled the section from Liss Forest to Liss. This saved the block man the trip of walking up the platform with the ticket after the work train had cleared. It was a misty day and the passenger train armed with the ticket passed the signal at red which then led to the fatal crash.

Closure

In the light of the reducing role of the military and the severely reduced British Empire, it was decided by the Ministry of Defence to close the railway. On hearing of its impending closure, local locomotive preservation groups became interested in acquiring the small but complete rail system, and a bid was placed to purchase LMR along with the airstrip at Gypsy Hollow which would have enabled the production of a unique transport museum. The MOD rejected this proposal, which had been backed by the Association of Railway Preservation Societies and The Transport Trust.  However, the Army did offer the last 1½ miles of line from Liss Forest Road to Liss. The offer was accepted, a provisional lease was drawn up and planning permission was sought for developments at Liss.

Unfortunately, the people of Liss did not share this enthusiasm and opposed the planning permission.  Several residents raised £9,100 in a successful bid to buy this last piece of line. Longmoor Military Railway closed down with a ceremonial last day of operation on 31 October 1969, though for another two years some locomotives and stock remained on site, and there were occasional movements.  Three items of rolling stock (a van, a brake van, and a bogie flat) still remain on the Longmoor site, as part of the FIBUA training village.

Preservation

Some of the stock of the LMR did pass into the hands of preservationists, for example Hunslet Austerity 0-6-0ST No.118 Brussels to the Keighley and Worth Valley Railway, and many relics went to the Museum of Army Transport at Beverley, Yorkshire, itself since closed, with the exhibits transferred to care of the National Army Museum, although mostly held in storage. WD Austerity 2-10-0 locomotive LMR 600 Gordon, resident on the Severn Valley Railway for many years, was donated to the SVR by the National Army Museum in 2008.

Preserved ex-LMR Locomotives

Some of the Hunslet Austerity tanks were only ever at Longmoor for storage, and were not used operationally there.

Preserved locomotives at Longmoor

With the withdrawal of locomotives from British Railways, a number were being bought by private individuals and groups who subsequently needed somewhere to store their purchases. In 1967 a group was formed called the 'Association of Railway Preservation Societies' (ARPS) and they were able to come to an agreement with the Army that allowed such locomotives to be stored at Longmoor for a nominal fee. The following locomotives were all included in this agreement.

In popular culture
The railway was used as the location for a number of films, including The Lady Vanishes (1938), Bhowani Junction (1956), The Inn of the Sixth Happiness (1958), Runaway Railway  (1965), The Great St Trinian's Train Robbery (1966), The Magnificent Two (1967) and Chitty Chitty Bang Bang (1968). It also appeared in Marty Feldman's comedy sketch "The loneliness of the long distance golfer"(1968).

In February 1956, the railway was used to stage a train derailment for the BBC programme Saturday Night Out, when ex-SR King Arthur class locomotive 30740 "Merlin" and three coaches were pushed down an incline onto a specially canted section of track.

Gallery

See also
 Melbourne Military Railway – Derbyshire

References

Further reading
 Ronald, D.W and Carter, R.J, (1974) The Longmoor Military Railway, Newton Abbot: David & Charles, .
 Ronald, D.W. and Christensen, M., (2012) The Longmoor Military Railway: A New History: Volume One: 1903–1939, Lydney: Lightmoor Press, .
 Mitchell, V. and Smith, K., (1987), Branch Lines to Longmoor, Midhurst: Middleton Press, .

External links 
 History at HantsWeb
 Industrial Railway Society article from 1966 also includes a map of the system
 British Pathe "Army Railway" newsreel from 1961
 Recollections of LMR operations
 History at Military Railways in Hampshire
 

Closed railway lines in South East England
Rail transport in Hampshire
18 in gauge railways in England
Military railways in the United Kingdom
Railway lines opened in 1903
Railway lines closed in 1969
Military history of Hampshire
Military education and training in the United Kingdom